Kopar is a railway station in Kopar Road, Dombivli. It lies on the Vasai Road–Roha route and Central main line of the Mumbai Suburban Railway network. It is a mini-junction that provides direct access to the Central line and Western line.

This station is located on 2 levels locally known as Lower Kopar (located on the Central Railway mainline) which has an elevation of 7.130 m & Upper Kopar (located on Vasai Road–Panvel Line) which has an elevation of 14.80 m.

Gallery

Railway stations in Thane district
Mumbai Suburban Railway stations
Mumbai CR railway division